Gurugram Sector 54 Chowk is a station of the Rapid Metro Gurgaon in Haryana, India. The station was opened to the public on 31 March 2017. It is owned by Haryana Mass Rapid Transport Corporation Limited (HMRTC) and operated by Delhi Metro Rail Corporation (DMRC). Earlier it was operated by Rapid Metro Gurgaon Limited (RMGL).

References

External links

 
 

Rapid Metro Gurgaon stations
Railway stations in Gurgaon district